Teide, or Mount Teide, ("Peak of Teide") is a volcano on Tenerife in the Canary Islands, Spain. Its summit (at ) is the highest point in Spain and the highest point above sea level in the islands of the Atlantic.

If measured from the ocean floor, its height of  makes Teide the third-highest volcano in the world, and is described by UNESCO and NASA as Earth's third-tallest volcanic structure. Teide's elevation above sea level makes Tenerife the tenth highest island in the world. Teide is an active volcano: its most recent eruption occurred in late 1909 from the El Chinyero vent on the northwestern Santiago rift. The United Nations Committee for Disaster Mitigation designated Teide a Decade Volcano because of its history of destructive eruptions and its proximity to several large towns, of which the closest are Garachico, Icod de los Vinos and Puerto de la Cruz. Teide, Pico Viejo and Montaña Blanca form the Central Volcanic Complex of Tenerife.

Teide is the most visited natural wonder of Spain, the most visited national park in Spain and Europe and – by 2015 – the eighth most visited in the world, with some 3 million visitors yearly. In 2016, it was visited by 4,079,823 visitors and tourists, reaching a historical record. Teide Observatory, a major international astronomical observatory, is located on the slopes of the mountain.

Name and legends 
Before the 1496 Spanish colonization of Tenerife, the native Guanches referred to a powerful figure living in the volcano, which carries light, power and the sun. El Pico del Teide is the modern Spanish name.

Teide was a sacred mountain for the aboriginal Guanches, so it was considered a mythological mountain, as Mount Olympus was to the ancient Greeks. When going on to Teide during an eruption, it was customary for the Guanches to light bonfires to scare Guayota. Guayota is often represented as a black dog, accompanied by his host of demons (Tibicenas).

The Guanches also believed that Teide held up the sky. Many hiding places found in the mountains contain the remains of stone tools and pottery. These have been interpreted as being ritual deposits to counter the influence of evil spirits, like those made by the Berbers of Kabylie. The Guanches believed the mountain to be the place that housed the forces of evil and the most evil figure, Guayota.

Guayota shares features similar to other powerful deities inhabiting volcanoes, such as the goddess Pele of Hawaiian mythology, who lives in the volcano Kīlauea and is regarded by the native Hawaiians as responsible for the eruptions of the volcano. The same was true for the ancient Greeks and Romans, who believed that Vulcano and Mount Etna were chimneys of the foundry of the fire god Hephaestus (Vulcan in Latin).

In 1492, when Christopher Columbus arrived at the island of Tenerife, his crew claimed to see flames coming from the highest mountain of the island (Teide).

Formation 

The stratovolcanoes Teide and Pico Viejo (Old Peak, although it is in fact younger than Teide) are the most recent centres of activity on the volcanic island of Tenerife, which is the largest and highest island in the Canaries. It has a complex volcanic history. The formation of the island and the development of the current Teide volcano took place in the five stages shown in the diagram on the right.

Stage one 
Like the other Canary Islands, and volcanic ocean islands in general, Tenerife was built by accretion of large shield volcanoes, three of which developed in a relatively short period. This early shield stage volcanism formed the bulk of the emerged part of Tenerife. The shield volcanoes date back to the Miocene and early Pliocene and are preserved in three isolated and deeply eroded massifs: Anaga (to the northeast), Teno (to the northwest) and Roque del Conde (to the south). Each shield was apparently constructed in less than three million years, and the entire island in about eight million years.

Stages two and three 
The initial juvenile stage was followed by a period of 2–3 million years of eruptive quiescence and erosion. This cessation of activity is typical of the Canaries; La Gomera, for example, is currently at this stage. After this period of quiescence, the volcanic activity became concentrated within two large edifices: the central volcano of Las Cañadas, and the Anaga massif.

Stage four 
Around 160–220 thousand years ago the summit of the Las Cañadas I volcano collapsed, creating the Las Cañadas (Ucanca) caldera. Later, a new stratovolcano, Las Cañadas II, formed in the vicinity of Guajara and then catastrophically collapsed. Another volcano, Las Cañadas III, formed in the Diego Hernandez sector of the caldera. All of the Las Cañadas volcanoes attained a maximum altitude similar to that of Teide (which is sometimes referred to as the Las Cañadas IV volcano).

Two theories on the formation of the  caldera exist. The first states that the depression is the result of a vertical collapse of the volcano triggered by the emptying of shallow magma chambers at around sea level under the Las Cañadas volcano after large-volume explosive eruptions. The second theory is that the caldera was formed by a series of lateral gravitational collapses similar to those described in Hawaii. Evidence for the latter theory has been found in both onshore observations and marine geology studies.

Stage five 
From around 160,000 years ago until the present day, the stratovolcanoes of Teide and Pico Viejo formed within the Las Cañadas caldera.

Historical eruptions 
Teide last erupted in 1909 from the El Chinyero vent, on the Santiago Ridge. Historical volcanic activity on the island is associated with vents on the Santiago or northwest rift (Boca Cangrejo in 1492, Montañas Negras in 1706, Narices del Teide or Chahorra in 1798, and El Chinyero in 1909) and the Cordillera Dorsal or northeast rift (Fasnia in 1704, Siete Fuentes and Arafo in 1705). The 1706 Montañas Negras eruption destroyed the town and principal port of Garachico, as well as several smaller villages.

Historical activity associated with the Teide and Pico Viejo stratovolcanoes  occurred in 1798 from the Narices del Teide on the western flank of Pico Viejo. Eruptive material from Pico Viejo, Montaña Teide and Montaña Blanca partially fills the Las Cañadas caldera. The last explosive eruption involving the central volcanic centre was from Montaña Blanca around 2000 years ago. The last eruption within the Las Cañadas caldera occurred in 1798 from the Narices del Teide or Chahorra (Teide's Nostrils) on the western flank of Pico Viejo. The eruption was predominantly strombolian in style and most of the lava was ʻaʻā. This lava is visible beside the Vilaflor–Chio road.

Christopher Columbus reported seeing "a great fire in the Orotava Valley" as he sailed past Tenerife on his voyage to discover the New World in 1492. This was interpreted as indicating that he had witnessed an eruption there. Radiometric dating of possible lavas indicates that in 1492 no eruption occurred in the Orotava Valley, but one did occur from the Boca Cangrejo vent.

The last summit eruption from Teide occurred about the year 850 AD, and this eruption produced the "Lavas Negras" or "Black Lavas" that cover much of the flanks of the volcano.

About 150,000 years ago, a much larger explosive eruption occurred, probably of Volcanic Explosivity Index 5. The  summit of Teide itself, and its sister stratovolcano Pico Viejo, are both situated in the northern half of the caldera and are derived from eruptions later than this prehistoric explosion.

Future eruptions
Future eruptions may include pyroclastic flows and surges similar to those that occurred at Mount Pelée, Merapi, Vesuvius, Etna, the Soufrière Hills, Mount Unzen and elsewhere. During 2003, there was an increase in seismic activity at the volcano and a rift opened on the north-east flank. No eruptive activity occurred but a quantity of material, possibly liquid, was emplaced into the edifice and is estimated to have a volume of ~1011 m3. Such activity can indicate that magma is rising into the edifice, but is not always a precursor to an eruption.

Teide additionally is considered structurally unstable and its northern flank has a distinctive bulge. The summit of the volcano has a number of small active fumaroles emitting sulfur dioxide and other gases, including low levels of hydrogen sulfide.

A scientific assessment in 2006, published in the journal Eos, observed that "in the past 30,000 years, eruptions have occurred at a rate of only four to six per millennium, with a predominance (70%) of very low hazard, basaltic eruptions". The authors further commented that "the recent eruptive record, combined with the available petrological and radiometric data, provides a rather optimistic outlook on major volcanic hazards related to Teide and its rift zones, posing only very localized threats to the one million inhabitants of Tenerife and the 4.5 million annual visitors to Teide National Park." However, another study in 2009 concluded that Teide will probably erupt violently in the future, and that its structure is similar to that of Vesuvius and Etna. Thus the magnitude of the risk posed by Teide to the public remains a source of debate.

Major climbs 
In a publication of 1626, Sir Edmund Scory, who probably stayed on the island in the first decades of the 17th century, gives a description of Teide, in which he notes the suitable paths to the top and the effects its considerable height causes for travellers, indicating that the volcano had been accessed via different routes before the 17th century. In 1715 the English traveler J. Edens and his party made the ascent and reported their observations in the journal of the Royal Society in London.

After the Enlightenment, most of the expeditions that went to East Africa and the Pacific had Teide as one of the most rewarding targets. The expedition of Lord George Macartney, George Staunton and John Barrow in 1792 almost ended in tragedy, as a major snowstorm and rain swept over them and they failed to reach the peak of Teide, just barely getting past Montaña Blanca.

The German scientist Alexander von Humboldt stopped in Tenerife during his voyage to South America in 1799 and climbed Teide with his travelling companion Aimé Bonpland and some local guides.

During an expedition to Kilimanjaro, the German adventurer Hans Heinrich Joseph Meyer visited Teide in 1894 to observe ice conditions on the volcano. He described the two mountains as "two kings, one rising in the ocean and the other in the desert and steppes".

More recently in November 2017, Gema Hassen-Bey became the first Paralympic athlete in the world in a wheelchair to reach 3,000 meters altitude with only the momentum of her arms. Initially, Gema wanted to reach the top of Teide, although, due to weather conditions, she could not meet this objective.

Flora and fauna 

The lava flows on the flanks of Teide weather to a very thin but nutrient- and mineral-rich soil that supports a wide variety of plant species. Vascular flora consists of 168 plant species, 33 of which are endemic to Tenerife.

These plants are adapted to the tough environmental conditions on the volcano, such as high altitude, intense sunlight, extreme temperature variations, and lack of moisture. Adaptations include hemispherical forms, a downy or waxy cover, a reduction of the exposed leaf area, and high flower production. Flowering takes place in the late spring or early summer, in May and June.

Teide National Park contains a large number of invertebrate species, over 40% of which are endemic species, and 70 of which are found only in the National Park. The invertebrate fauna includes spiders, beetles, dipterans, hemipterans, and hymenopterae.

In contrast, Teide National Park has only a limited variety of vertebrate fauna. Ten species of bird nest there, including the blue chaffinch (Fringilla teydea), Berthelot's pipit (Anthus berthelotii berthelotii), the Atlantic canary (Serinus canaria) and a subspecies of kestrel (Falco tinnunculus canariensis).

Three endemic reptile species are found in the park: the Canary Island lizard (Gallotia galloti galloti), the Canary Island wall gecko (Tarentola delalandii), and the Canary Island skink (Chalcides viridanus viridanus).

The only mammals native to the park are bats, the most common of which is Leisler's bat (Nyctalus leisleri). Other mammals, such as the mouflon, the rabbit, the house mouse, the black rat, the feral cat, and the North African hedgehog, have all been introduced to the park.

The shadow of Teide 

Teide casts the world's largest shadow projected on the sea. The shadow is cast for more than 40 km from the mountain's summit, reaching as far as the island of La Gomera at dawn, and the island of Gran Canaria at sunset. The shadow has a perfectly triangular shape, even though Teide's silhouette does not; this is an effect of aerial perspective. Visitors and tourists climb to the top of the volcano at sunset to witness this phenomenon.

Scientific use 
Teide National Park is a useful volcanic reference point for studies related to Mars because of the similarities in their environmental conditions and geological formations. In 2010 a research team tested the Raman instrument at Las Cañadas del Teide in anticipation of its use in the 2016–2018 ESA-NASA ExoMars expedition. In June 2011 a team of researchers from the UK visited the park to test a method for looking for life on Mars and to search for suitable places to test new robotic vehicles in 2012.

Access 
The volcano and its surroundings, including the whole of the Las Cañadas caldera, are protected in the Teide National Park. Access is by a public road running from northeast to southwest across the caldera. TITSA runs a return service to Teide once a day from both Puerto de la Cruz and Playa de las Americas. The park has a Parador (hotel) and a small chapel. A cable car goes from the roadside at  most of the way to the summit, reaching , carrying up to 38 passengers (34 in a high wind) and taking eight minutes to reach the summit. Access to the summit itself is restricted; a free permit is required to climb the last . Numbers are normally restricted to 200 per day. Several footpaths take hikers to the upper cable car terminal, and then onto the summit.

Because of the altitude, the air is significantly thinner than at sea level. This can cause people (especially with heart or lung conditions) to become light-headed or dizzy, to develop altitude sickness, and in extreme cases to lose consciousness. The only treatment is to return to lower altitudes and acclimatise.

Astronomical observatory 

An astronomical observatory is located on the slopes of the mountain, taking advantage of the good weather, and the altitude, which puts it above most clouds, and promotes stable Astronomical seeing. The Teide Observatory is operated by the Instituto de Astrofísica de Canarias. It includes solar, radio and microwave telescopes, in addition to traditional optical night-time telescopes.

Symbol 
Teide is the main symbol of Tenerife and the most emblematic natural monument of the Canary Islands. An image of Teide, gushing flames, appears at the centre of Tenerife's coat of arms. Above the volcano appears St. Michael, the patron saint of Tenerife. The flag colors of the island are dark blue, traditionally identified with the sea that surrounds the island, and white for the whiteness of the snow-covered peaks of Mount Teide during winter. The logo of the Cabildo de Tenerife (governing body of the island) includes a symbol of Teide in eruption.

Teide has been depicted frequently throughout history, from the earliest engravings made by European conquerors to typical Canarian craft objects, on the back of 1000-peseta notes, in oil paintings and on postcards.

In the Canary Islands, especially on Tenerife, Teide has cultural symbolism deeply rooted in traditions and history. It is popularly referred to as Padre Teide (Father Teide).

Mountain of the Moon 
Mons Pico, one of the Montes Teneriffe range of lunar mountains in the inner ring of the Mare Imbrium, was named by Johann Hieronymus Schröter after the Pico von Teneriffe, an 18th-century name for Teide.

There is also a brown dwarf star located in the open star cluster of the Pleiades called Teide 1.

See also
 Teide National Park
 Roque Cinchado
 Mount Guajara
 Pico Viejo
 Tenerife
 List of tallest mountains in the Solar System

Notes

References

External links

 UNESCO World Heritage Site datasheet
 Teide National Park—Official Website
 Teide Webcam
 Cable car 
  Description of the ascent of Mount Teide
 

Mountains of the Canary Islands
Volcanoes of the Canary Islands
VEI-5 volcanoes
Active volcanoes
Pleistocene stratovolcanoes
Holocene stratovolcanoes
Hotspot volcanoes
Decade Volcanoes
Three-thousanders
Mythological mountains
Tenerife
Tourism in Spain
Tourist attractions in Tenerife
Highest points of countries
Extreme points of Spain
Underworld